Indonesia participated in the 2009 Asian Youth Games in Singapore on 29 June – 7 July 2009.

Indonesia sent 44 athletes. Indonesia finished with 1 bronze medal which they got in beach volleyball.

Medalists

References 

2009 in Indonesian sport
Sport in Indonesia
Nations at the 2009 Asian Youth Games
Indonesia at the Asian Games